Hans-Heinrich Voigt (18 April 1921 – 17 November 2017) was a German astronomer who was Director of the Göttingen Observatory.

Voigt was the director of the Göttingen Observatory from 1975 to 1983. He was a member of the Göttingen Academy of Sciences and was its president from 1978 to 1979.  In 1993 he received the Carl Friedrich Gauss Medal.

In 1988 an asteroid was named 4378 Voigt after him.

He died on 17 November 2017 at the age of 96 in Göttingen.

Works

 Outline of Astronomy (1974) 
 Das Universum (1994)  
 Abriß der Astronomie (2012)

References

1921 births
2017 deaths
20th-century German astronomers
People from Nienburg (district)